Uzi most commonly refers to an Israeli submachine gun family.

Uzi may also refer to:

Music 
Performers
 Uzi (band), a 1980s band fronted by Thalia Zedek
 Uzi (Japanese rapper), Japanese hip-hop artist
 Uzi (French rapper) (born 1999), French singer
 Uzi (Turkish rapper) (born 1998), Turkish rapper
 Da Uzi (born 1994), French hip hop artist of Congolese origin
 Lil Uzi Vert (born 1995), rapper from Philadelphia, Pennsylvania

Albums
 Uzi, a 1989 album by Muslimgauze

Songs
 "Uzi" (Pinky Ring), a 2001 song by Wu-Tang Clan

People 
 Uzi (gamer) (born 1997), in-game name of Jian Zi-Hao Chinese League of Legends player
 Uzi Arad, Israeli strategist
 Uzi Even (born 1940), Israeli professor of chemistry and former politician
 Uzi Gal (1923–2002), designer and namesake of the Uzi submachine gun
 Uzi Hitman (1952–2004), musician
 Uzi Landau (born 1943), Israeli politician
 Uzi Narkiss (1925–1997), Israeli general
 Uzi Rubin (born 1957), Israeli defense engineer and analyst
 Uzi Vishkin (born 1953), Israeli American professor of computer science and engineering

Places 
 Uzi, an alternate romanization for Uji, Kyoto, a town in Japan
 Uzi Island, an island in Zanzibar, Tanzania
 Uzi, Zanzibar, a settlement on Uzi Island, Zanzibar
 Uzi, Iran (disambiguation), places in Iran

See also
 Uziel (disambiguation)
 Uzi fly, a parasitoid of silkworm
 Apache Oozie, a workflow scheduling system to manage Hadoop jobs